Taj West End is a five-star hotel in Bengaluru, India. It is a heritage hotel in Bengaluru. Classified under the Taj Group's business hotels section, the 133-year-old hotel is considered the oldest hotel in the city.

History
In 1887, a British woman named Mrs. Bronson started a boarding house with 10 beds. As the popularity of the first hotel in the city grew, it began to expand. In 1912, the place changed hands, with Spencer's buying it for a princely Rs.4,000. Decades later, in 1984, it was sold again, to the management of what is now the Taj West End.

See also
List of hotels in Bengaluru
List of hotels in India

References

Taj Hotels Resorts and Palaces
Heritage hotels in India
Hotels in Bangalore